Dave Randall (born May 8, 1967) is a former professional tennis player from the United States.

Randall enjoyed most of his tennis success while playing doubles. During his career, he won three doubles titles. He achieved a career-high doubles ranking of World No. 39 in 1994.

Career finals

Doubles (3 wins, 8 losses)

External links
 
 

American male tennis players
Ole Miss Rebels men's tennis players
Sportspeople from Birmingham, Alabama
Sportspeople from Memphis, Tennessee
Tennis people from Alabama
Tennis people from Tennessee
Living people
1967 births